Neelidae is a family of springtails in the order Neelipleona. There are at least 4 genera and more than 30 described species in Neelidae.

Genera
These four genera belong to the family Neelidae:
 Megalothorax Willem, 1900
 Neelides Caroli, 1912
 Neelus Folsom, 1896
 Zelandothorax Delamare Debouteville & Massoud, 1963

References

Further reading

External links

 

Collembola
Articles created by Qbugbot
Arthropod families